Detlef Mikolajczak (born 15 April 1964) is a retired German football midfielder.

References

External links
 

1964 births
Living people
German footballers
Bundesliga players
VfL Bochum players
Place of birth missing (living people)
Association football midfielders